Toonerville is an unincorporated community in Venango County, in the U.S. state of Pennsylvania.

History
The community was named after Toonerville Folks, a comic strip.

References

Unincorporated communities in Venango County, Pennsylvania
Unincorporated communities in Pennsylvania